In commutative algebra, the support of a module M over a commutative ring A is the set of all prime ideals  of A such that  (that is, the localization of M at  is not equal to zero). The support is, by definition, a subset of the spectrum of A.

Properties 
  if and only if its support is empty.
 Let  be a short exact sequence of A-modules. Then

Note that this union may not be a disjoint union.
 If  is a sum of submodules , then 
 If  is a finitely generated A-module, then  is the set of all prime ideals containing the annihilator of M. In particular, it is closed in the Zariski topology on Spec A.
If  are finitely generated A-modules, then

Support of a quasicoherent sheaf 
If F is a quasicoherent sheaf on a scheme X, the support of F is the set of all points x in X such that the stalk Fx is nonzero. This definition is similar to the definition of the support of a function on a space X, and this is the motivation for using the word "support". Most properties of the support generalize from modules to quasicoherent sheaves word for word. For example, the support of a coherent sheaf (or more generally, a finite type sheaf) is a closed subspace of X.

If M is a module over a ring A, then the support of M as a module coincides with the support of the associated quasicoherent sheaf  on the affine scheme Spec A. Moreover, if  is an affine cover of a scheme X, then the support of a quasicoherent sheaf F is equal to the union of supports of the associated modules Mα over each Aα.

Examples 

is the ideal . This implies that , the vanishing locus of the polynomial f. Looking at the short exact sequence

we might mistakenly conjecture that the support of I = (f) is Spec(R(f)), which is the complement of the vanishing locus of the polynomial f. In fact, since R is an integral domain, the ideal I = (f) = Rf  is isomorphic to R as a module, so its support is the entire space: Supp(I) = Spec(R).

The support of a finite module over a Noetherian ring is always closed under specialization.

Now, if we take two polynomials  in an integral domain which form a complete intersection ideal , the tensor property shows us that

See also
Annihilator (ring theory)
Associated prime
Support (mathematics)

References 

 Atiyah, M. F., and I. G. Macdonald, Introduction to Commutative Algebra, Perseus Books, 1969,  

Module theory